The 1937 process of selecting inductees to the Baseball Hall of Fame was markedly different from the initial elections the previous year. As only half of the initial goal of 10 inductees had been selected in 1936, members of the Baseball Writers' Association of America (BBWAA) were once again given authority to select any players active in the 20th century; but the unsuccessful 1936 Veterans Committee election for 19th-century players led to a smaller Centennial Commission choosing a handful of inductees whose contributions were largely as non-players.

In the BBWAA election, voters were again instructed to cast votes for 10 candidates, but were now discouraged from casting votes for active players, although some player-managers whose playing days were largely over, such as Rogers Hornsby, received votes. Any candidate receiving votes on at least 75% of the ballots would be honored with induction to the Hall upon its opening in the sport's supposed centennial year of 1939. Again, individuals who had been barred from baseball were not formally ineligible; Hal Chase received some votes, although Shoeless Joe Jackson did not. Balloting by the BBWAA resulted in the election of three players: Nap Lajoie, Tris Speaker, and Cy Young.

BBWAA vote
A total of 201 ballots were cast, with 1,949 individual votes for 113 specific candidates, an average of 9.70 per ballot; 151 votes were required for election. Selections were announced on January 19, 1937. The three candidates who received at least 75% of the vote and were elected are indicated in bold italics; candidates who have since been selected in subsequent elections are indicated in italics.

Centennial Commission
After the error-ridden 1936 Veterans election failed to select any 19th-century players, the Hall opted in 1937 to have a small committee select inductees "for outstanding service to base ball apart from playing the game." The Commission's members were: Commissioner Kenesaw Mountain Landis; National League president Ford Frick; American League president Will Harridge; Judge William G. Bramham, president of the National Association of Professional Baseball Leagues (the minor league overseeing body); former NL president John Heydler; and George Trautman, president of the minor league American Association and chairman of the National Association's executive committee. At the December 1937 major league winter meetings in Chicago, Frick announced that the Commission had elected five people. The selections were:

Connie Mack and John McGraw, who had been excellent players in the 1890s and had gone on to be the winningest managers in their respective leagues – Mack with nine American League pennants and five World Series titles, and McGraw with ten National League pennants and three World Series titles;
Morgan Bulkeley, the NL's first president (1876), and Byron "Ban" Johnson, the AL's founder and first president (1900–1927); and
George Wright, who formed baseball's first professional team in 1869 and became the game's first outstanding shortstop. He was also a successful manager and led a number of global barnstorming tours.

Of the five selectees, only Mack was still living when the selections were made.

References

External links
1937 Election at www.baseballhalloffame

Baseball Hall of Fame balloting
1937 in baseball